William Gordon Stables (21 May 1840 – 10 May 1910) was a Scottish-born medical doctor in the Royal Navy and a prolific author of adventure fiction, primarily for boys.

Life and works 

William Gordon Stables was born in Aberchirder, in Banffshire (now part of Aberdeenshire). After studying medicine at the University of Aberdeen, he served as a surgeon in the Royal Navy. He came ashore in 1875, and settled in Twyford, Berkshire, in England.

He wrote over 130 books. The bulk of his large output is boys' adventure fiction, often with a nautical or historical setting. He also wrote books on health, fitness and medical subjects, and the keeping of cats and dogs. 

For over 20 years Stables was the medical columnist for The Girl's Own Paper, writing under the peusdonym 'Medicus'. He was also a copious contributor of articles and stories to The Boy's Own Paper.

Stables has been regarded as one of the most prominent of the English imitators of Jules Verne, especially in his novels of polar adventure, like The Cruise of the Snowbird (1882), Wild Adventures Round the Pole (1883), From Pole to Pole (1886), and  "his most ambitious novel," The Cruise of the Crystal Boat (1891).

He is also notable as the first person to order a "gentleman’s caravan" from the Bristol Wagon & Carriage Works, in which he travelled the length of Great Britain in 1885 (the subject of his book The Gentleman Gypsy).

Stables was a strong opponent of vivisection.

Family
Stables married Theresa "Lizzie" McCormack on 15 July 1874 and they had four sons and two daughters. He died in at his home in Twyford, Berkshire on 10 May 1910 from tuberculosis.

Selected works by Gordon Stables

 Medical Life in the Navy (1868)
 The Domestic Cat (1876)
 Cats: Their Points and Characteristics (1877)
 Wild Adventures in Wild Places (1881)
 Aileen Aroon (1884)
 On Special Service: A Tale of the Sea (1886)
 Exiles of Fortune: A Tale of a Far North Land (1890)
 Two Sailor Lads (1892)
 The Dog: From Puppyhood to Age (1893)
 Sable And White: The Autobiography of a Show Dog (1894)
 A Souvenir of the "Wanderer" Caravan (1895)
 To Greenland and the Pole (1895)
 For Life and Liberty (1896)
 Off to Klondyke (1898)
 'Twixt School and College (1901)
 With Cutlass and Torch (1901)
 Every Inch a Sailor (1903)
 In the Great White Land: A Tale of the Antarctic Ocean (1903)
 Our Friend the Dog (1903)
 Westward with Columbus (1906)
 Young Peggy McQueen  (1906)
 The Sauciest Boy in the Service: A Story of Pluck and Perseverance (1911)

References

External links 

 British Juvenile Story Papers and Pocket Libraries Index
 
 
 

1840 births
1910 deaths
Anti-vivisectionists
People from Banff and Buchan
Royal Navy Medical Service officers
Scottish children's writers
Scottish non-fiction writers
Scottish science fiction writers